Birg refers to:

Birg (Bernese Alps), a mountain in Switzerland
the Austrian EDV-Handler BIRG
Birg (Hillfort), hillfort in Baierbrunn

See also
Barg (disambiguation)
Berg (disambiguation)
Borg (disambiguation)
Burg (disambiguation)